Erica Georgina Terpstra (born 26 May 1943) is a retired Dutch politician of the People's Party for Freedom and Democracy (VVD).

Terpstra, a swimmer by occupation, participated in the 1960 and 1964 Summer Olympics. She was elected as a Member of the House of Representatives after the Dutch general election of 1977 serving from 8 June 1977 until 22 August 1994 when she became Undersecretary for Health, Welfare and Sport in the Cabinet Kok I serving from 22 August 1994 until 3 August 1998. After the Dutch general election of 1998 Terpstra returned to the House of Representatives serving from 19 May 1998 until 15 December 2003 when she was selected as President of the Dutch Olympic Committee*Dutch Sports Federation (NOC*NSF).

Biography

Swimming 
During the early 1960s Terpstra was a well-known freestyle swimmer in the Netherlands, specializing in the 100 meters. She participated in the 1960 Summer Olympics in Rome where she came sixth in the 100m Freestyle, and fourth in the 4x100 Medley Relay. Following the Olympics she joined the HZ&PC swim team in The Hague. While a member of this team she was again chosen to be an Olympic athlete for the Netherlands and won two medals at the 1964 Summer Olympics in Tokyo: the bronze medal in the 4x100 metres Freestyle Relay and the silver in the 4x100 metres Medley Relay (together with Pauline van der Wildt (starting), Toos Beumer (second relay) en Winnie van Weerdenburg (third relay)). At her only individual start, on the 100m Freestyle, she finished in fourth position in the final.

In addition to her Olympic exploits, Terpstra won the 1962 European championships and was champion of the Netherlands several times.

Interim years 
After her swimming career Terpstra became a teacher, teaching Dutch to Chinese immigrants.

Following that she became a sports journalist.

Politics 
In 1977 Terpstra was elected to the parliament for the People's Party for Freedom and Democracy (VVD), just barely making it into parliament on a seat appointed to the VVD in the fractional division. She remained in parliament through 2003 though, with a four-year break (1994–1998) during which she served as state secretary for Health, Welfare and Sport in the Kok-I cabinet.

Upon leaving parliament in 2003, she was the senior member of the House, having been re-elected with a large number of preference votes each term (311.000 in 1994).

Sports official 
On 21 October 2003 Terpstra was elected chairperson of the NOC*NSF, beating out Ruud Vreeman (the NOC*NSF board-nominated candidate) in the election. As chair in 2005 she was the first to present the new Fanny Blankers-Koen Trophy, which was named for legendary Dutch athlete Fanny Blankers-Koen. Terpstra presented the award to Anton Geesink, Sjoukje Dijkstra, Nico Rienks and Ard Schenk in the new skating rink in Turin, a few months before the start of the 2006 Winter Olympics. She was supposed to award an FBK Trophy to Johan Cruijff as well, but he couldn't make it due to obligations at the pool drawing for the 2006 FIFA World Cup in Leipzig.

During her tenure with NOC*NSF she was always well known for being present at every major sporting event in which Dutch athletes competed and for being exuberantly enthusiastic at every success. Terpstra retired from NOC*NSF in May 2010.

Film and television
Terpstra made her movie debut in 2004 in the movie version of the children's book Pluk van de Petteflet by Annie M.G. Schmidt. She played the role of mayor. Since early 2011 Terpstra hosts her own Travel-TV programme Erica op Reis for Dutch broadcaster Omroep MAX.

Personal life

 Terpstra has a Theosophist background. She is very drawn to Buddhism. Rather than considering herself a Buddhist though, she refers to herself as a "life-long student of Buddhism".
 Terpstra was married and has two sons.
 On 8 June 2008 Terpstra received the Major Bosshardt Prize for exceptional contributions to Dutch society.
 On 10 December 2008 Terpstra presented a book entitled Help, I'm losing weight! (Dutch: Help ik val af!). This describes how she lost 40 kilos in six months.

Decorations

References

External links

Official
  E.G. (Erica) Terpstra Parlement & Politiek

 
 

1943 births
Living people
Dutch sports executives and administrators
Dutch sports journalists
Dutch lobbyists
Dutch television presenters
Dutch television producers
Dutch Theosophists
Dutch sportsperson-politicians
Dutch people of Austrian descent
European Aquatics Championships medalists in swimming
Dutch female freestyle swimmers
World record setters in swimming
Knights of the Order of the Netherlands Lion
Leiden University alumni
Medalists at the 1964 Summer Olympics
Members of the House of Representatives (Netherlands)
Members of the Provincial Council of Utrecht
Officers of the Order of Orange-Nassau
Olympic bronze medalists for the Netherlands
Olympic bronze medalists in swimming
Olympic silver medalists for the Netherlands
Olympic silver medalists in swimming
Olympic swimmers of the Netherlands
People's Party for Freedom and Democracy politicians
Swimmers from The Hague
State Secretaries for Health of the Netherlands
Swimmers at the 1960 Summer Olympics
Swimmers at the 1964 Summer Olympics
20th-century Dutch educators
20th-century Dutch women politicians
20th-century Dutch politicians
20th-century Dutch women writers
21st-century Dutch educators
21st-century Dutch women politicians
21st-century Dutch politicians
21st-century Dutch women writers
Dutch women television presenters
Dutch women television producers